Just No Other Way is the first full English-language album by Hong Kong singer Coco Lee, released on November 2, 1999. It consists of pop and R&B songs. It features the singles "Do You Want My Love" and "Wherever You Go", and album track "Before I Fall in Love" was included on the Runaway Bride soundtrack. "Do You Want My Love" became a moderate hit, peaking at number 49 on the US Hot Dance Club Play chart, while "Wherever You Go" peaked at number 29 in Australia. As of February 2000, the album has sold 500,000 copies in Asia. As of June 2003, Just No Other Way only sold 40,000 copies in the United States, according to Nielsen SoundScan.

Reception

Just No Other Way was a relative success in Asia, having three top ten singles (including one number one single) in the MTV Asia Hitlist. As soon as "Before I Fall in Love" topped the charts as her breakthrough single, Lee became the first female Asian singer to top both the Asia Hitlist and Top 100 Asia Singles Airplay. Her next single, "Do You Want My Love", peaked at number two for six weeks, while her last single, "Wherever You Go", managed to peak at number three. This is another record for Lee, becoming the only Asian artist to have three singles enter the top three in the Asia Hitlist.

Track listing
 "Do You Want My Love" (Saskia Garel, Jimmy Greco, Jillian Armsbury, Kenneth Hairston) – 4:35
 "Just No Other Way (To Love Me)" (Dane DeViller, Sean Hosein, Jack Kugell) – 4:14
 "Can't Get Over" (featuring Kelly Price) (Belmatt, Hansen, Price) – 4:06
 "Did You Ever Really Love Me?" (Ray Contrereas, Greco) – 4:02
 "Before I Fall in Love" (DeViller, Hosein, Allan Rich, Dorothy Gazeley) – 3:44
 "Wherever You Go" (Arnold Roman, Steve Skinner) – 4:19
 "I Will Be Your Friend" (DeViller, Hosein, Michelle Lewis) – 3:28
 "All Tied Up in You" (Ty Lacy, Bradley Spalter) – 4:17
 "Don't You Want My Love" (Nova) – 3:50
 "Crazy Ridiculous" (Steve Clarke, Darnell Cunningham, Harold Frasier, Nicole Renee, Roget Romain) – 3:02
 "Can We Talk About It" (Erik "E-Smooth" Hicks) – 3:58

International standard edition/Japan bonus track:
 "Do You Want My Love" (Hex Hector Radio Edit) – 3:50

Korea bonus tracks:
 "Do You Want My Love" (Kenny Diaz Remix) – 3:53
 "Just No Other Way" (featuring Jin-young Park) – 4:15

Charts

Album

Singles

Release history

References

1999 albums
Coco Lee albums